Hajjiabad (also Romanized as Ḩājjīābād) is a village in Pas Kalut Rural District, in the Central District of Gonabad County, Razavi Khorasan Province, Iran. At the 2006 census, its population was 554, in 145 families.

References 

Populated places in Gonabad County